Woodbine Street Recording Studios is a recording studio located in the town of Leamington Spa, England. There are two recording rooms, the first being the main 31 square metre one. The second is a 13.6 square metre 'live' room which is wood panelled, optimising it for the recording of drums. The studio also offers a CD mastering service and on-site accommodation is available with kitchen, shower room, TV rest area and sleeping quarters for five people. Since it opened the studio has moved from its original location to St Mary's Crescent, in south Leamington.

Artists that have used the studio facilities include:

Balaam and the Angel
Blow Up
The Bomb Party
Buzzcocks
The Chameleons 
Clan of Xymox
Close Lobsters
B. J. Cole
Daniel Ash 
The Darkside
David J
Dead Can Dance
Dr. Phibes and the House of Wax Equations
Dr. Robert
The Dylans 
Eyeless in Gaza
Felt
The Jazz Butcher Conspiracy
King Adora
L'Âme Immortelle
The Loft
Love & Rockets 
Manifesto
Max Eider
Mighty Mighty
Ocean Colour Scene
Persephone
Piano Magic
The Specials
Nikki Sudden
Mick Taylor
Paul Weller
The Shapes
Sopor Æternus & the Ensemble of Shadows
Whispers in the Shadow

References

External links
 Woodbine Street Studios homepage

Recording studios in England
Buildings and structures in Leamington Spa